Kristoffer Knudsen Larsen (born 19 January 1992) is a Norwegian footballer.

Career
Larsen was born in Bergen and started his career at Vestsiden-Askøy IL. As an 18-year-old he got the chance in A.C. Milan's farmer-club Bellinzona on a trial. Larsen returned to Bergen where he completed the 2010 season with Askøy, before joining Brann ahead of the 2011-season. Although injuries prevented him from making the initial B-team of young players who could play in league games for Brann, impressive games for Brann 2 and in Cup games saw him offered a professional contract. He made his Tippeligaen debut when he replaced Diego Guastavino in the 77th minute against Strømsgodset on 7 August 2011.

Career statistics

References

External links
Profile at altomfotball.no

1992 births
Living people
Norwegian footballers
Norwegian expatriate footballers
Footballers from Bergen
Eliteserien players
Danish Superliga players
Association football midfielders
SK Brann players
Hønefoss BK players
Lyngby Boldklub players
Sarpsborg 08 FF players
Åsane Fotball players
Norwegian expatriate sportspeople in Denmark
Expatriate footballers in Denmark